Heliocarpus is a genus of flowering plants in the family Malvaceae. It was formerly classified in the Tiliaceae.

It was first published in Linnaeus's book Species Plantarum on page 448 in 1753.

The native range of this genus stretches from Mexico to southern Tropical America and the island of Trinidad. It is found in the countries of Argentina , Belize, Bolivia, Brazil, Colombia, Costa Rica, Ecuador, El Salvador, Guatemala, Honduras, Mexico, Nicaragua, Panamá, Paraguay, Peru, Trinidad, Tobago, and Venezuela.

Species
According to Plants of the World Online (Kew) it contains;

 Heliocarpus americanus 
 Heliocarpus appendiculatus 
 Heliocarpus attenuatus 
 Heliocarpus donnellsmithii 
 Heliocarpus mexicanus 
 Heliocarpus nodiflorus 
 Heliocarpus occidentalis 
 Heliocarpus pallidus 
 Heliocarpus palmeri 
 Heliocarpus parvimontis 
 Heliocarpus terebinthaceus 
 Heliocarpus velutinus 

GRIN only lists Heliocarpus americanus L.

Ecology
In Veracruz in Mexico, a species of rust fungus Pucciniosira pallidula  infects Heliocarpus donnellsmithii .

References

External links

Grewioideae
Malvaceae genera
Taxa named by Carl Linnaeus
Flora of Mexico
Flora of Central America
Flora of Trinidad and Tobago
Flora of western South America
Flora of southern South America